The 2009–10 season was Barnsley's 101st season in the Football League since joining in 1898.

Kit and sponsorship
Barnsley's kits continue to be designed by Lotto and the main shirt sponsor stays as Barnsley Building Society.

Season review

Events
29 August 2009 – Simon Davey is sacked by Barnsley.
9 September 2009 – Mark Robins is confirmed as the new Manager of Barnsley.

League
Barnsley started the league with a 2–2 draw with Sheffield Wednesday. This was followed by defeats by Coventry City and Preston North End, this kept Barnsley in the relegation zone with just one point. Then a 3–1 defeat to Reading put Barnsley to the bottom of the table and subsequently saw manager Simon Davey relieved of his duties. Their first win of the season came when they beat Derby County 3–2. This was followed by a draw against Swansea City, then a 5–2 loss to Queens Park Rangers. They bounced back with a shocking scoreline as they beat West Bromwich Albion 3–1. Ipswich Town and Doncaster Rovers both suffered defeats against the Tykes. This was followed by a defeat against Nottingham Forest and then the Tykes lost 3–2 against Bristol City. They bounced back with a 2–1 win over Peterborough United at London Road this was followed with a 2–2 draw with Sheffield United. They Tykes then beat Cardiff City with Dickinson grabbing an injury time winner. On 28 November the Tykes took on Plymouth Argyle at Home Park, the Tykes were winning 4–1 before referee Gavin Ward called off the game in the 58th minute. Following this unfortunate event the Tykes took on play-off contenders Blackpool who they beat 2–1, becoming the first side to take all three points from Bloomfield Road. This was followed by three consecutive draws against Scunthorpe United, Newcastle United and Crystal Palace.

After their boxing day clash with Preston North End was postponed due to a frozen pitch at Deepdale, the Tykes took on Middlesbrough, who they beat 2–1, with two second half goals. Coventry City beat Barnsley 3–1 on the first league game of the New Year and then a 2–1 loss to Sheffield Wednesday but quickly bouncing back to back Leicester City.

FA Cup
Barnsley were knocked out of the cup by Scunthorpe United when they were beaten 1–0.

League Cup
Round One – Lincoln City 0–1 Barnsley: The Reds travelled to Sincil Bank to face Lincoln City, where Daniel Bogdanovic netted the only goal in a 1–0 win.

Round Two – Reading 1–2 Barnsley: The Reds faced Reading away and two more goals from Bogdanovic either side of Rob Kozluk's own goal put them into the third round.

Round Three – Barnsley 3–2 Burnley: Barnsley entertained Premier League side Burnley. The away side took the lead through Steven Fletcher before Jon Macken's immediate equaliser. Anderson de Silva then drilled in a piledriver to make it 2–1 and Chris Eagles equalised. Hugo Colace headed the winner.

Round Four – Barnsley 0–2 Manchester United: Daniel Welbeck opened the score for Manchester United, Gary Neville was then sent off. Michael Owen put the visitors 2–0 up.

Squad

Current squad

Squad statistics
Last Updated 2 May 2010

|}

 * Indicates player left club during the season.

Disciplinary record

Transfers

Summer transfers in

Summer transfers out

 * Indicates player joined club after being released.

Loan In

Loans out

January transfers in

January transfers out

League table

Fixtures and results

League

FA Cup

League Cup

References

Barnsley F.C. seasons
Barnsley